Hussein Omar Abdulghani Sulaimani  (born 21 January 1977) is a Saudi Arabian former professional footballer who played as a left-back in the Saudi Professional League.

Club career

Al-Ahli
Abdulghani began his career at Al-Ahli joining the youth team in 1992. He originally started his career as a forward but he was moved to full-back, the position he would mainly play, by Amin Dabo the youth team manager at the time. Abdulghani made his Al-Ahli debut on 26 September 1995 in a Federation Cup tie with Al-Qadsiah. The match ended in a 2–1 loss.

On 25 November 1995, Abdulghani made his league in the derby match against Al-Ittihad that ended in a 2–1 win. He made 24 appearances in all competitions in his first season with the club as Al-Ahli finished runners-up in the league. In his second season, Abdulghani missed matches for Al-Ahli due to the national team's participation in the 1996 AFC Asian Cup. On 25 December 1997, Abdulghani scored his first league goal for the club against Al-Wehda. On 11 March 1998, Abdulghani started the Crown Prince Cup final against Al-Riyadh and provided the assist for Masaad's golden goal in the 97th minute, as Al-Ahli won their third Crown Prince Cup title. This was Al-Ahli's first silverware since 1985. On 15 November 1999, Abdulghani made his continental debut for Al-Ahli against Syrian side Al-Jaish in the 1999–2000 Asian Cup Winners' Cup.

Abdulghani missed most of the 2001–02 season with Al-Ahli through injury after injuring his anterior cruciate ligament while on international duty. He was substituted in the 84th minute in the 2002 FIFA World Cup qualification match against Thailand on 21 October 2001. He made his return on 15 March 2002 in the Gulf Club Champions Cup match against Emirati side Al-Shabab. On 22 March 2002, Abdulghani started in the 2–0 win against Omani side Dhofar as Al-Ahli won their second Gulf Club Champions Cup. On 27 December 2002, Abdulghani was suspended for six matches for comments he made towards the referee, Mamdouh Al-Mirdas, following the loss against Al-Hilal. On 3 February 2003, Abdulghani started the Arab Unified Club Championship final against Tunisian side Club Africain as Al-Ahli won their first Arab title.

Following the retirement of Mohammed Al-Jahani, Abdulghani was named as the club captain starting from the 2004–05 season. His first final as club captain ended in a loss in the 2005 Federation Cup final against Al-Hilal. Six months later, Abdulghani also captained the side in the 2006 Crown Prince Cup final loss against Al-Hilal as well. On 9 February 2007, Abdulghani captained Al-Ahli as they won their third Federation Cup, defeating derby rivals Al-Ittihad in the final by 3–0 at the Prince Abdullah Al-Faisal Stadium. Two months later, on 27 April 2007, Abdulghani captained Al-Ahli as they won their fifth Crown Prince Cup title, defeating derby rivals Al-Ittihad in the final once again.

In May 2007, Abdulghani was loaned to Qatari side Al-Rayyan on a short-term deal. He made one appearance in the Emir of Qatar Cup quarter-finals. Abdulghani missed a penalty in the penalty shoot-outs as Al-Rayyan were eliminated by Al-Arabi. On 4 April 2008, Abdulghani was sent off in the league match against Najran, and was suspended for two matches. On 26 April 2008, his suspension was lifted. On 27 April 2008, Abdulghani made his final appearance for Al-Ahli in the 3–1 loss against Al-Shabab in the 2nd leg of the King Cup quarter-finals.

Later career
He then moved to Swiss based Neuchâtel Xamax staying for a year. He made 13 appearances without scoring. His transfer to Europe had made him the third Saudi footballer to play in Europe, after Sami Al-Jaber and Fahad Al-Ghesheyan. In 2009, he returned to Saudi Arabia to play for Al-Nassr. He is one of the longest-tenured and most experienced Saudi footballers.

On 13 September 2017, he signed a one-year contract with Bulgarian First League club Vereya. He hoped to take a chance to play for the Saudi Arabia national team at the 2018 FIFA World Cup in Russia. In June 2018, he went back to Saudi Arabia to sign for the newly promoted Ohod. In January 2019, he returned to his former club Al-Ahli. On 15 October 2020, Abdulghani announced his retirement.

International career
Abdulghani was a regular member of the Saudi Arabia national team. He was on the national team that won 1996 AFC Asian Cup at age 19. He was selected for the 1998, 2002 and 2006 FIFA World Cups. Abdulghani announced his retirement from international football after failing to lead his national team to the 2010 FIFA World Cup. On 6 October 2018, he received a call-up for a friendly match against Brazil.

Career statistics

Club
Updated 1 September 2022.

International

International goals

Honours
Al-Ahli
Crown Prince Cup: 1998, 2002, 2006–07
Saudi Federation Cup: 2001, 2002, 2007
Arab Champions League: 2002–03
Gulf Club Champions Cup: 2002, 2008
 International Friendship Football Tournament: 2001, 2002

Neuchâtel Xamax FCS
 Swiss Cup - 3rd place

Al-Nassr
Pro League: 2013–14, 2014–15
Crown Prince Cup: 2013–14
 Baniyas International Championship: 2011, 2013
 Alwehda International Championship: 2012

OHOD
 Gulf of Aqaba Cup: 2018
 Jordan International Championship: 2018

Saudi Arabia
 Summer Olympic Games: 1996 Summer Olympics
AFC Asian Cup: 1996
Arab Nations Cup: 1998, 2002
 Gulf Cup: 2002
1997 FIFA Confederations Cup: Group Stage
1998 FIFA World Cup: Group Stage
1999 FIFA Confederations Cup: 4th Place
2002 FIFA World Cup: Group Stage
2006 FIFA World Cup: Group Stage
individual
 The best promising Gulf player in 1996.
 Best Arab player in 1997.
 He won the best player award 3 times from 8 matches in the final qualifiers for the World Cup in France, as a record for a player in the defense line.
 He was chosen to play in the Asian Stars team in Moscow in 1998.
 He was chosen to play in the World Stars team in 1997 and 2000 in Marseille.
 He won the SANYO award for the best Asian full back in 2000.
 Best defender in the Arab Clubs Cup in 2003 in Jeddah.
 The best Arab player in the World Cup twice, 1998 AD and 2006.
 He was chosen as the best Saudi football player in 2006.
 The US magazine Esquire chose him as the best international player for teams in the Middle East and North Africa in the first decade of the millennium (2000 - 2009).
 The Best Asian Goal Award for the month of April 2011 from the Asian Confederation.
 Best Saudi Defender of 2014 from Opta.
 Best Professional in Bulgaria in 2018.

Other prizes
 1997: Saudi Arabia - Al-Ahli Club Golden Shield
 1998: Morocco - Arab Excellence Award from the Moroccan Arab Sports Magazine
 2002: Palestine - the shield of the Palestinian Football Association for its support for the Palestinian cause
 2014: France - Civilization and Excellence Award from the Encyclopedia of Excellence and World Civilization in Paris
 2017: Qatar - World Cup Ambassador for Orphans in Qatar

See also
 List of men's footballers with 100 or more international caps

References

External links

1977 births
Living people
Sportspeople from Jeddah
Saudi Arabian footballers
Association football fullbacks
Al-Ahli Saudi FC players
Al-Rayyan SC players
Neuchâtel Xamax FCS players
Al Nassr FC players
FC Vereya players
Ohod Club players
Saudi Professional League players
Qatar Stars League players
Swiss Super League players
First Professional Football League (Bulgaria) players
Saudi Arabia youth international footballers
Saudi Arabia international footballers
Olympic footballers of Saudi Arabia
Footballers at the 1996 Summer Olympics
1996 AFC Asian Cup players
1997 FIFA Confederations Cup players
1998 FIFA World Cup players
1999 FIFA Confederations Cup players
2002 FIFA World Cup players
2006 FIFA World Cup players
AFC Asian Cup-winning players
FIFA Century Club
Saudi Arabian expatriate footballers
Saudi Arabian expatriate sportspeople in Qatar
Saudi Arabian expatriate sportspeople in Switzerland
Saudi Arabian expatriate sportspeople in Bulgaria
Expatriate footballers in Qatar
Expatriate footballers in Switzerland
Expatriate footballers in Bulgaria